José Pablo Burtovoy (born 6 November 1976) was an Argentine football goalkeeper. He retired in early 2015. After his retirement Burtovoy was part of the management of Bolivia's Soccer team.

Career

Burtovoy has previously played for Colón de Santa Fe, CD Veracruz, Club Atlético Belgrano, Arsenal de Sarandí, Chacarita Juniors, Pioneros de Ciudad Obregón, Club León (this last two in Mexico) and Independiente Santa Fe (this last in Colombia).

In 2007, Burtovoy helped Real Potosí to win the Bolivian league for the first time in their history.

Honours

Club
 Real Potosí
 Liga de Fútbol Profesional Boliviano: 2007 (A)

External links
 
 

1976 births
Living people
Footballers from Santa Fe, Argentina
Argentine footballers
Argentine people of Russian descent
Argentine expatriate footballers
Association football goalkeepers
Club Atlético Colón footballers
C.D. Veracruz footballers
Club Atlético Belgrano footballers
Arsenal de Sarandí footballers
Chacarita Juniors footballers
Independiente Santa Fe footballers
C.D. Jorge Wilstermann players
Club Real Potosí players
Sport Boys footballers
Club León footballers
Comisión de Actividades Infantiles footballers
Provincial Osorno footballers
Chilean Primera División players
Argentine Primera División players
Primera Nacional players
Categoría Primera A players
Expatriate footballers in Chile
Expatriate footballers in Peru
Expatriate footballers in Mexico
Expatriate footballers in Bolivia
Expatriate footballers in Colombia
Expatriate footballers in Venezuela
Argentine expatriate sportspeople in Chile
Argentine expatriate sportspeople in Peru
Argentine expatriate sportspeople in Bolivia
Argentine expatriate sportspeople in Colombia
Argentine expatriate sportspeople in Venezuela
Argentine expatriate sportspeople in Mexico
Argentina youth international footballers